Zoya Barantsevich was a film actress in the Russian Empire.

Selected filmography 
 1914 — Anna Karenina
 1916 — Tale of the Blue Sea
 1916 — Nelli Raintseva
 1917 — Revolutionary

References

External links 
 Зоя Баранцевич on kino-teatr.ru

1896 births
1952 deaths
Actresses from the Russian Empire